Simon Douglas-Pennant, 7th Baron Penrhyn (born 28 June 1938), is a British nobleman. He is the current holder of the title of Baron Penrhyn – he succeeded his father Nigel's elder brother the 6th Baron, who died without male issue in 2003.

He studied at Eton College and Clare College, Cambridge, where he represented the university at cricket from 1959 to 1961 as a left-arm opening bowler. In the match against Free Foresters in 1959 he took his best innings and match figures in first-class cricket: 7 for 56 and 3 for 115, for match figures of 10 for 171.

On 5 October 1963 he married Josephine Upcott, daughter of Robert Upcott. They have four children:
Sophie Margaret (born 11 December 1964), married Michael Robert Trotter in 1989, has issue
Edward Sholto (born 6 June 1966), heir apparent to the title; currently with no issue
Hugo Charles (born 21 April 1969), married Lucianne Rush in 2005, has issue
Harriet Josephine (born 25 May 1972), married Claus Nicholas in 2005, has issue

Arms

References

External links
 
 Simon Douglas-Pennant at CricketArchive

Living people
1938 births
7
Simon
Free Foresters cricketers
People educated at Eton College
Alumni of Clare College, Cambridge
Cambridge University cricketers
English cricketers